Bernard James "B. J." Swanson (November 21, 1948 - August 13, 1975) was an American racing driver. Swanson was killed in a Formula 5000 race in 1975.

Racing career
Aged 18 Swanson entered a Triumph TR4 to race in a regional SCCA club race. The organizers of the meeting, the South Bend Region SCCA, informed Swanson that the minimum age to compete was 21, not 18. Soon after Swanson joined a Michigan SCCA region to compete, registered as 21 years old.

The young driver from Bristol, Indiana, competed in Formula Ford. In the early 70's Swanson won races in the SCCA Central Division championship Formula Ford and also competed at the June Sprints. In 1974 Swanson entered his first, and only, SCCA National Championship Runoffs. The Indiana racing driver contested both the Formula Ford and Formula A class. In Formula Ford Swanson qualified his Zink Z10 in thirteenth place. He failed to finish the race. In Formula A Swanson contested a Lola T192 powered by a Chevrolet engine. The car was entered by Bay Racing Enterprises, a team set up in late 1973 by former drivers Bob Bay and Rick Vendl. The Lola was bought from Carl Haas. At the Runoffs Swanson ran fifth when he was hit from behind by Larry McNeil forcing both cars to retire.

For 1975 team owner Bay set Swanson up with engineer Jerry Eisert, an IndyCar veteran crew chief. The team replaced the aging T192 chassis with a newer T332 chassis. After a test at Rattlesnake Raceway, the team entered the first race of the 1975 SCCA/USAC Formula 5000 Championship. At Pocono International Raceway Swanson qualified eleventh and finished the race in seventh place, behind Bobby Unser. Swanson was a frequent top ten qualifier and scored impressive results. He scored his first, and only, podium finish at Watkins Glen International. Qualifying fourth the Indiana native finished third in the race, behind Al Unser and race winner Brian Redman. After this success Dan Gurney signed Swanson to contest the 1976 Indy 500 with All American Racers.

The racing career of Swanson was cut short by a fatal accident at the Mid-Ohio Sports Car Course in 1975. During the weekend Swanson was very strong, qualifying seventh and placing fourth in the heat race. At the start of the race the throttle stuck open. Swanson made a heavy impact with the guardrail. As the lower guardrail broke, the upper guardrail hit the helmet of the racing driver. The race continued while Dan Gurney, head of the rescue crew, extricated Swanson from the car. In life-threatening condition Swanson was rushed to Mansfield General Hospital in nearby Mansfield, Ohio. Swanson succumbed to his wounds two days later on 13 August 1975. A memorial service was held at Saint Joseph's Catholic Church in Fort Wayne, Indiana.

The car was later restored, converted and competed in the 1978 Can-Am season.

Complete motorsports results

SCCA National Championship Runoffs

American Open-Wheel racing results
(key) (Races in bold indicate pole position, races in italics indicate fastest race lap)

SCCA/USAC Formula 5000 Championship

References

1948 births
1975 deaths
Sports deaths in Ohio
Racing drivers who died while racing
Racing drivers from Indiana
People from Bristol, Indiana
SCCA National Championship Runoffs participants
Formula Ford drivers